Statistics of Emperor's Cup in the 1921 season.

Overview
It was contested by 4 teams, and Tokyo Shukyu-dan won the championship. The winning team consisted of graduates from Toshima Teachers College, Aoyama Teachers College and Tokyo Teachers College.

Results

Semifinals
Nagoya Shukyu-dan 0–4 Mikage Shukyu-dan
Yamaguchi High School (withdrew) – Tokyo Shukyu-dan

Final

References

 NHK

Emperor's Cup
1921 in Japanese football